Limushan is a town under the administration of Qiongzhong Li and Miao Autonomous County, Hainan, China. , it administers four residential neighborhoods and 12 villages:
Neighborhoods
Yaozi Community
Yangjiang
Dafeng
Xinjing

Villages
Xinlin Village
Yaozi Village
Rongmu Village
Dabao Village
Gantong Village
Nanji Village
Nanli Village
Wodai Village
Damu Village
Hejiu Village
Songtao Village
Xin Village

References 

Township-level divisions of Hainan
Qiongzhong Li and Miao Autonomous County